Klippert is a surname of German origin. Notable people with the surname include:

Billy Klippert, Canadian rock singer-songwriter
Brad Klippert (born 1957), American politician
George Klippert (1926-1996), Canadian gay man
Serhiy Klippert (born 1989), Ukrainian Paralympic swimmer

References

Surnames of German origin